The 2005 European Junior Swimming Championships were held in Budapest, Hungary 14–17 July.

Medal table

Medal summary

Boy's events

|-
| 50 m freestyle

|-
| 100 m freestyle

 
|-
| 200 m freestyle

|-
| 400 m freestyle

|-
| 1500 m freestyle

|-
| 50 m backstroke

|-
| 100 m backstroke

|-
| 200 m backstroke

|-
| 50 m breaststroke

|-
| 100 m breaststroke

|-
| 200 m breaststroke

|-
| 50 m butterfly

|-
| 100 m butterfly

|-
| 200 m butterfly

|-
| 200 m individual medley

|-
| 400 m individual medley

|-
| 4 × 100 m freestyle relay

|-
| 4 × 200 m freestyle relay

|-
| 4 × 100 m medley relay

|}

Girl's events

|-
| 50 m freestyle

|-
| 100 m freestyle

|-
| 200 m freestyle

|-
| 400 m freestyle

|-
| 800 m freestyle

|-
| 50 m backstroke

|-
| 100 m backstroke

|-
| 200 m backstroke

|-
| 50 m breaststroke

|-
| 100 m breaststroke

|-
| 200 m breaststroke

|-
| 50 m butterfly

|-
| 100 m butterfly

|-
| 200 m butterfly

|-
| 200 m individual medley

|-
| 400 m individual medley

|-
| 4 × 100 m freestyle relay

|-
| 4 × 200 m freestyle relay

|-
| 4 × 100 m medley relay

|}

2005 in swimming
2005 in Hungarian sport
European Junior Swimming Championships
International sports competitions in Budapest
International aquatics competitions hosted by Hungary
Swimming
July 2005 sports events in Europe